Weldon Charles Goodman (born April 23, 1957) is a former American football running back who played for the St. Louis Cardinals. He played college football at University of Cincinnati.

Goodman led the Cincinnati Bearcats in 1983 in receptions with 51. He also scored the second and final TD in the Bearcats epic win against defending National Champion Penn State. Prior to entering the NFL, he was a member of the United States Marine Corps.

References 

1957 births
Living people
Players of American football from Los Angeles
American football running backs
National Football League replacement players
Cincinnati Bearcats football players
St. Louis Cardinals (football) players
Crenshaw High School alumni
United States Marines